Nadine (with the variant spellings: Nadeen, Nadene) is a female given name. It is a French elaboration (feminine diminutive; cf. Clémentine, Géraldine, Micheline) of the name Nadia (also spelled Nadja, Nadya), itself being a pet form of the Russian virtue name Nadezhda (from ).

It may refer to:

 Nádine (born 1982), South African singer
 Nadine Ames (born 1991), Indonesian beauty pageant titleholder who won Puteri Indonesia 2010
 Nadine Angerer (born 1978), German football player
 Nadine Baylis (1940–2017), British stage and costume designer
 Nadine Beiler (born 1990), Austrian singer
 Nadine Blacklock (1953–1998), American nature photographer
 Nadine Broersen (born 1990), Dutch heptathlete
 Nadine Capellmann (born 1965), German equestrian
 Nadine Chandrawinata (born 1984), Indonesian beauty pageant titleholder who won Puteri Indonesia 2005
 Nadine Chanz (born 1972), German Playboy model and actress
 Nadine Conner (1914–2003), American soprano
 Nadine Jolie Courtney (born 1980), American novelist and reality TV personality
 Nadine Coyle (born 1985), singer in the all-girl group Girls Aloud
 Nadine Deleury, French cellist 
 Nadine Dorries (born 1957), British politician
 Nadine Ernsting-Krienke (born 1974), German field hockey player
 Nadine Garner (born 1970), Australian actress
 Nadine George (born 1968), West Indian cricketer
 Nadine Gordimer (1923–2014), Nobel and Booker Prize–winning South African novelist
 Nadine Heredia, politician and First Lady of Peru
 Nadine Hildebrand (born 1987), German athlete
 Nadeen L. Kaufman (born 1945), American psychologist
 Nadine Kleinert (born 1975), German shot put athlete
 Nadine Kraus (born 1988), German footballer
 Nadine Krause (born 1982), German handball player
 Nadine Labaki, Lebanese actress and director
 Nadine Lambert (1926–2006), American psychology and education professor
 Nadine Lewington, British actress
 Nadine Lockwood (1991–1996), child from Washington Heights, New York, murdered by her mother
 Nadine Lustre (born 1993), Filipina actress 
 Nadine Mohamed (born 1998), Egyptian basketball player
 Nadine Mulkerrin (born 1993), English actress
 Nadine Müller (born 1985), German discus thrower
 Nadine Netter (born 1944), American tennis player
 Nadine Neumann (born 1975), Australian swimmer
 Nadine Nassib Njeim (born 1984), Lebanese model
 Nadine Wilson Njeim (born 1988), Lebanese model
 Nadine Pequeneza, Canadian documentary film director and producer
 Nadine Salameh (born 1979), Syrian/Palestinian actress
 Nadine Samonte (born 1988), German-Filipina actress
 Nadine Schiff, Canadian film producer, screenwriter, author
 Nadine Schön (born 1983), German politician
 Nadine Shah (born 1986), British singer-songwriter 
 Nadine Shahin (born 1997), Egyptian squash player
 Nadine Shamir (1972–2004), American singer-songwriter
 Nadine Strossen (born 1950), president of the American Civil Liberties Union
 Nadine Trintignant (born 1934), French filmmaker and author
 Nadine Velazquez (born 1978), American actress and model
 Nadine Visser (born 1995), Dutch heptathlete
 Nadine Voindrouh (born 1977), Romanian singer, actress and television presenter
 Nadine Wilson, Canadian politician

Fictional characters
Nadine, a fictional character played by Marion Cotillard in the 2006 film Dikkenek
Marina Nadine Cooper, fictional character on the CBS soap opera Guiding Light
Nadine Cross, fictional character in Stephen King's novel The Stand
Nadine Boynton, a fictional character in Agatha Christie's novel Appointment with Death
Nadine Hurley, fictional character on the television series Twin Peaks
Nadine Flumberghast, a fictional character in Arthur
Nadine, a fictional character in the TV series Hey Arnold!
Nadine Ross, a fictional character played by Laura Bailey in the 2016 Naughty Dog video game Uncharted 4: A Thief's End
Nadine Hudson-Thomas, a fictional character played by Anne-Marie Johnson  on the TV series What's Happening Now!!
Nadine Tolliver, a fictional character played by Bebe Neuwirth on the CBS TV Series Madam Secretary
Nadine, a fictional character played by Hailee Steinfeld in the 2016 film The Edge of Seventeen
Nadine Foster, a main character in Jacqueline Wilson's Girls Series and its CITV adaptation, where she is played by Amy Kwolek.

See also
Nadine (disambiguation)
Nadia (disambiguation)
Nadezhda (disambiguation)

References

Arabic feminine given names
English feminine given names
French feminine given names
German feminine given names
Dutch feminine given names
Romanian feminine given names